Clara Jane Bryant Ford (April 11, 1866 – September 29, 1950) was the wife of Henry Ford. She was an active suffragist and was inducted into the Michigan Women's Hall of Fame.

Early life 
Clara Jane Bryant was born on April 11, 1866, to Melvin S. Bryant, a farmer, and Martha Beach in Wayne County, Michigan, at the intersection of Grand River Road and Greenfield Road. The third of ten children, she was baptized on April 19 at St. John's Episcopal Church in Detroit. In 1870, her family moved about half a mile north to another farm in Wayne County. She attended Greenfield Township District No. 3 School.

Later life 

Clara married Henry Ford on April 11, 1888 until his death on April 7, 1947 four days shy of their 59th wedding Anniversary. They had one child: Edsel Ford (1893–1943). Their son Edsel died in 1943.

She was with Henry Ford upon his first test of a gasoline engine on December 24, 1891.

Ford was an active suffragist, often holding meetings at Fair Lane. In 1918, she was named Vice-Chair of the Dearborn branch of the Equal Suffrage League of Wayne County. Three years later, she served on the board of directors of the Michigan League of Women Voters. 

Ford was also President of the Woman's National Farm & Garden Association (1927-1934)

Ford died on September 29, 1950, at Henry Ford Hospital in Detroit.

Fair Lane 

Fair Lane was the estate of Henry and Clara Ford, in Dearborn. A statue of Henry and Clara Ford stands in the Rose Garden of Fair Lane.

References

Bibliography 

 

1866 births
1950 deaths
American suffragists
People from Wayne County, Michigan
Henry Ford family